The 5th Illinois General Assembly, consisting of the Illinois Senate and the Illinois House of Representatives, met from December 4, 1826, to February 19, 1827,  at The Vandalia State House.  The apportionment of seats in the House of Representatives was based on the provisions of the First Illinois Constitution. Political parties were not established in Illinois at the time.

The 5th General Assembly was preceded by the 4th Illinois General Assembly, and was succeeded by the 6th Illinois General Assembly.

Members

Senators and Representatives were both allotted to counties roughly by population and elected at-large within their districts.  Bond and Montgomery counties shared a single senator.

Senate

House of Representatives

Employees

Senate 
 Secretary: Emanuel J. West
 Enrolling and Engrossing Clerk: A.F. Grant
 Sergeant at Arms: Joseph Chance

House of Representatives 
 Clerk: William Lee D. Ewing
 Enrolling and Engrossing Clerk:  H. Roundtree
 Doorkeeper: Bowling Green

See also
 List of Illinois state legislatures

Works cited

References

Illinois legislative sessions
Illinois General Assembly
Illinois General Assembly
Illinois
Illinois